Ives Estates is a census-designated place (CDP) in Miami-Dade County, Florida. The population was 25,005 at the 2020 census, up from 19,525 in 2010.

Geography
It is bordered to the north by Broward County. Neighboring communities are Ojus to the east and southeast, North Miami Beach to the south and Miami Gardens to the west. To the north, in Broward County, are West Park and Pembroke Park, while Miramar is to the northwest and Hallandale Beach is to the northeast.

Interstate 95 forms the border between Ives Estates and Ojus, with access from Exit 16 (Ives Dairy Road). County Road 854 (Ives Dairy Road/NE 203rd Street/NE 199th Street) is the main road through the center of Ives Estates, leading east to Aventura and west to Miami Gardens.

Demographics

2020 census

As of the 2020 United States census, there were 25,005 people, 7,859 households, and 5,279 families residing in the CDP.

2000 census
As of the census of 2000, there were 17,586 people, 6,923 households, and 4,506 families residing in the CDP. The racial makeup of the CDP was 51.10% White (33.3% were Non-Hispanic White,) 35.11% African American, 0.17% Native American, 4.63% Asian, 0.05% Pacific Islander, 3.76% from other races, and 5.17% from two or more races. Hispanic or Latino of any race were 24.08% of the population.

There were 6,923 households, out of which 32.7% had children under the age of 18 living with them, 40.8% were married couples living together, 19.2% had a female householder with no husband present, and 34.9% were non-families. 28.3% of all households were made up of individuals, and 9.1% had someone living alone who was 65 years of age or older.  The average household size was 2.54 and the average family size was 3.13.

In the CDP, the population was spread out, with 24.8% under the age of 18, 8.6% from 18 to 24, 33.6% from 25 to 44, 20.6% from 45 to 64, and 12.4% who were 65 years of age or older.  The median age was 35 years. For every 100 females, there were 83.8 males.  For every 100 females age 18 and over, there were 79.3 males.

The median income for a household in the CDP was $40,717, and the median income for a family was $43,370. Males had a median income of $29,512 versus $27,544 for females. The per capita income for the CDP was $19,118.  About 7.0% of families and 8.6% of the population were below the poverty line, including 8.4% of those under age 18 and 8.8% of those age 65 or over.

As of 2000, speakers of English as a first language accounted for 54.25% of residents, while Spanish made up 24.45%, French Creole was at 11.65%, French was at 2.35%, Urdu at 1.23%, Portuguese 1.11%, and Arabic was 1.08% of the population. Hebrew made up 0.73% of speakers, Russian made up 0.69%, and both Chinese and Tagalog was the mother tongue of 0.57% of the population.

Education
Miami-Dade County Public Schools operates public schools.
 Madie Ives K-8 Preparatory Academy
 Dr. Michael M. Krop High School

References

External links
 Madie Ives Elementary School

Census-designated places in Miami-Dade County, Florida
Census-designated places in Florida